Whitbourne may refer to:

Places
 Whitbourne, Herefordshire, England
 Whitbourne, Newfoundland and Labrador, Canada
 Whitbourne Moor, Wiltshire, England

People with the surname
 Bill Whitbourne (1902–1970), Australian rules footballer 
 Richard Whitbourne (1561–1635), English colonist, mariner and author

Other uses
 Whitbourne Hall, country house in Whitbourne, Herefordshire, England